Mark Shriver could refer to:

Mark D. Shriver, American population geneticist.
Mark Kennedy Shriver (born 1964), American politician